Lohikoski is a Finnish surname. Notable people with the surname include:

Aino Lohikoski (1898–1981), Finnish actress
Armand Lohikoski (1912–2005), Finnish film director and writer
Pia Lohikoski, Finnish politician

Finnish-language surnames